This List of Asian art awards covers some of the main art awards given by organizations in Asia. Some are restricted to artists from a particular country or region, and some are open to artists from around the world.

India

Israel

Japan

Southeast Asia

Other

See also
Lists of art awards

References

Asian art
Asian